Koichi Sato or Kōichi Satō may refer to:

, Japanese actor
, Japanese biathlete
, Japanese footballer
, Japanese philatelist
, Japanese ski jumper